Nearness of You: The Ballad Book is the seventh studio album by saxophone player Michael Brecker. Accompanied by Herbie Hancock on piano, Pat Metheny on guitars, Charlie Haden on bass, Jack DeJohnette on drums, and a special guest appearance by James Taylor, the album was released by Verve Records on June 19, 2001.

Brecker was awarded his eighth Grammy for Best Jazz Instrumental Solo on "Chan's Song". Taylor also won his fourth Best Male Pop Vocal Performance Grammy for "Don't Let Me Be Lonely Tonight".  With his win, he became the first American recording artist to garner a win in that category since Michael Bolton in 1992.

Track listing

Personnel
Michael Brecker – tenor saxophone
Pat Metheny – guitars
Herbie Hancock – piano
Charlie Haden – double bass
Jack DeJohnette – drums
James Taylor – vocal (on tracks 2 & 5)

Charts

Awards
2001 - 44th Annual GRAMMY Awards

References 

Michael Brecker albums
2001 albums
Verve Records albums
Instrumental albums
Albums recorded at MSR Studios